Fotografija (trans. Photography) is the second solo album of the Bosnian singer Dino Merlin.

Track listing

External links
Fotografija on Dino Merlin's official web site

Dino Merlin albums
1995 albums